The Boring Billion, otherwise known as the Mid Proterozoic and Earth's Middle Ages, is the time period between 1.8 and 0.8 billion years ago (Ga) spanning the middle Proterozoic eon, characterized by more or less tectonic stability, climatic stasis, and slow biological evolution. It is bordered by two different oxygenation and glacial events, but the Boring Billion itself had very low oxygen levels and no evidence of glaciation.

The oceans may have been oxygen- and nutrient-poor and sulfidic (euxinia), populated by mainly anoxygenic cyanobacteria, a type of photosynthetic bacteria which uses hydrogen sulfide (H2S) instead of water and produces sulfur instead of oxygen. This is known as a Canfield ocean. Such composition may have caused the oceans to be black- and milky-turquoise instead of blue.

Despite such adverse conditions, eukaryotes may have evolved around the beginning of the Boring Billion, and adopted several novel adaptations, such as various organelles, multicellularity, and possibly sexual reproduction, and diversified into plants, animals, and fungi at the end of this time interval. Such advances may have been important precursors to the evolution of large, complex life later in the Ediacaran and Phanerozoic. Nonetheless, prokaryotic cyanobacteria were the dominant lifeforms during this time, and likely supported an energy-poor food-web with a small number of protists at the apex level. The land was likely inhabited by prokaryotic cyanobacteria and eukaryotic proto-lichens, the latter more successful here probably due to the greater availability of nutrients than in offshore ocean waters.

Description
In 1995, geologists Roger Buick, Davis Des Marais, and Andrew Knoll reviewed the apparent lack of major biological, geological, and climatic events during the Mesoproterozoic era 1.6 to 1 billion years ago (Ga), and, thus, described it as "the dullest time in Earth's history". The term "Boring Billion" was coined by paleontologist Martin Brasier to refer to the time between about 2 and 1 Ga, which was characterized by geochemical stasis and glacial stagnation. In 2013, geochemist Grant Young used the term "Barren Billion" to refer to a period of apparent glacial stagnation and lack of carbon isotope excursions from 1.8 to 0.8 Ga. In 2014, geologists Peter Cawood and Chris Hawkesworth called the time between 1.7 and 0.75 Ga "Earth's Middle Ages" due to a lack of evidence of tectonic movement.

The Boring Billion is now largely cited as spanning about 1.8 to 0.8 Ga, contained within the Proterozoic eon, mainly the Mesoproterozoic. The Boring Billion is characterized by geological, climatic, and by-and-large evolutionary stasis, with low nutrient abundance.

In the time leading up to the Boring Billion, Earth experienced the Great Oxygenation Event due to the evolution of oxygenic photosynthetic cyanobacteria, and the resultant Huronian glaciation (Snowball Earth), formation of the UV-blocking ozone layer, and oxidation of several metals. Oxygen levels during the Boring Billion are thought to have been markedly lower than during the Great Oxidation Event, perhaps 0.1 to 10% of modern levels. It was ended by the breakup of the supercontinent Rodinia during the Tonian (1000–720 Ma) period, a second oxygenation event, and another Snowball Earth in the Cryogenian period.

Tectonic stasis 

The evolution of Earth's biosphere, atmosphere, and hydrosphere has long been linked to the supercontinent cycle, where the continents aggregate and then drift apart. The Boring Billion saw the evolution of two supercontinents: Columbia (or Nuna) and Rodinia.

The supercontinent Columbia formed between 2.0 and 1.7 Ga and remained intact until at least 1.3 Ga. Geological and paleomagnetic evidence suggest that Columbia underwent only minor changes to form the supercontinent Rodinia from 1.1 to 0.9 Ga. Paleogeographic reconstructions suggest that the supercontinent assemblage was located in equatorial and temperate climate zones, and there is little or no evidence for continental fragments in polar regions.

Due to the lack of evidence of sediment build-up (on passive margins) which would occur as a result of rifting, the supercontinent probably did not break up, and rather was simply an assemblage of juxtaposed proto-continents and cratons. There is no evidence of rifting until the formation of Rodinia, 1.25 Ga in North Laurentia, and 1 Ga in East Baltica and South Siberia. Breakup did not occur until 0.75 Ga, marking the end of the Boring Billion. This tectonic stasis may have been related in ocean and atmospheric chemistry.

It is possible the asthenosphere—the molten layer of Earth's mantle that tectonic plates essentially float and move around upon—was too hot to sustain modern plate tectonics at this time. Instead of vigorous plate recycling at subduction zones, plates were linked together for billions of years until the mantle cooled off sufficiently. The onset of this component of plate tectonics may have been aided by the cooling and thickening of the crust that, once initiated, made plate subduction anomalously strong, occurring at the end of the Boring Billion.

Nonetheless, major magmatic events still occurred, such as the formation (via magma plume) of the  central Australian Musgrave Province from 1.22 to 1.12 Ga, and the  Canadian Mackenzie Large Igneous Province 1.27 Ga. Plate tectonics were still active enough to build mountains, with several orogenies, including the Grenville orogeny, occurring at the time.

Climatic stability 

There is little evidence of significant climatic variability during this time period.  Climate was likely not primarily dictated by solar luminosity because the Sun was 5–18% less luminous than it is today, but there is no evidence that Earth's climate was significantly cooler. In fact, the Boring Billion seems to lack any evidence of prolonged glaciations, which can be observed at regular periodicity in other parts of Earth's geologic history. High CO2 could not have been a main driver for warming because levels would have needed to be 30 to 100 times greater than pre-industrial levels and produced substantial ocean acidification to prevent ice formation, which also did not occur. Mesoproterozoic CO2 levels may have been comparable to those of the Phanerozoic eon, perhaps 7 to 10 times higher than modern levels. The first record of ice from this time period was reported in 2020 from the 1 Ga Scottish Diabaig Formation in the Torridon Group, where dropstone formations were likely formed by debris from ice rafting; the area, then situated between 35–50°S, was a (possibly upland) lake which is thought to have frozen over in the winter and melted in the summer, rafting occurring in the spring melt.

A higher abundance of other greenhouse gases, namely methane produced by prokaryotes, may have compensated for the low CO2 levels; a largely ice-free world achieved by an atmospheric methane concentration of 140 parts per million (ppm). Methanogenic prokaryotes could not have produced so much methane, implying some other greenhouse gas, probably nitrous oxide, was elevated, perhaps to 3 ppm (10 times today's levels). Temperatures at the poles dropped below freezing in winter, allowing for temporary sea ice formation and snowfall, but there were likely no permanent ice sheets.

It has also been proposed that, because the intensity of cosmic rays has been shown to be positively correlated to cloud cover, and cloud cover reflects light into space and reduces global temperatures, lower rates of bombardment during this time due to reduced star formation in the galaxy caused less cloud cover and prevented glaciation events, maintaining a warm climate. Also, some combination of weathering intensity which would have reduced CO2 levels by oxidation of exposed metals, cooling of the mantle and reduced geothermal heat and volcanism, and increasing solar intensity and solar heat may have reached an equilibrium, barring ice formation.

Conversely, glacial movements over a billion years ago may not have left many remnants today, and an apparent lack of evidence could be due to the incompleteness of the fossil record rather than absence. Further, the low oxygen and solar intensity levels may have prevented the formation of the ozone layer, preventing greenhouse gasses from being trapped in the atmosphere and heating the Earth via the greenhouse effect, which would have caused glaciation. Though not much oxygen is necessary to sustain the ozone layer, and levels during the Boring Billion may have been high enough for it, the Earth may have been more heavily bombarded by UV radiation than today.

Oceanic composition
The oceans seem to have had low concentrations of key nutrients thought to be necessary for complex life, namely molybdenum, iron, nitrogen, and phosphorus, in large part due to a lack of oxygen and resultant oxidation necessary for these geochemical cycles. Nutrients could have been more abundant in terrestrial environments, such as lakes or nearshore environments closer to continental runoff.

In general, the oceans may have had an oxygenated surface layer, a sulfidic middle layer, and suboxic bottom layer. The predominantly sulfidic composition may have caused the oceans to be a black- and milky-turquoise color instead of blue.

Oxygen
Earth's geologic record indicates two events associated with significant increases in oxygen levels on Earth, with one occurring between 2.4 and 2.1 Ga, known as the Great Oxygenation Event, and the second occurring an approximate 0.8 Ga, known as the Neoproterozoic Oxygenation Event. The intermediary period, during the Boring Billion, is thought have had low oxygen levels (with minor fluctuations), leading to widespread anoxic waters.

The oceans may have been distinctly stratified, with surface water being oxygenated and deep water being suboxic (less than 1 μM oxygen), the latter possibly maintained by lower levels of hydrogen (H2) and H2S output by deep sea hydrothermal vents which otherwise would have been chemically reduced by the oxygen. Even in the shallowest waters, significant quantities of oxygen may have been restricted mainly to areas near the coast. The decomposition of sinking organic matter would have also leeched oxygen from deep waters.

The sudden drop in O2 after the Great Oxygenation Event—indicated by δ13C levels to have been a loss of 10 to 20 times the current volume of atmospheric oxygen—is known as the Lomagundi-Jatuli Event, and is the most prominent carbon isotope event in Earth's history. Oxygen levels may have been less than 0.1 to 1% of modern-day levels, which would have effectively stalled the evolution of complex life during the Boring Billion. However, some evidence from the Velkerri Formation in the Roper Group of the Northern Territory of Australia, the Kaltasy Formation of the Volga-Ural region of Russia, and the Xiamaling Formation in the northern North China Craton indicates a noticeable oxygenation event around 1.4 Ga, although the degree to which this represents global oxygen levels is unclear. Oxic conditions would have become dominant at the second oxygenation event causing the proliferation of aerobic activity over anaerobic, but widespread suboxic and anoxic conditions likely lasted until about 0.55 Ga corresponding with Ediacaran biota and the Cambrian explosion.

Sulfur

In 1998, geologist Donald Canfield proposed what is now known as the Canfield ocean hypothesis. Canfield claimed that increasing levels of oxygen in the atmosphere at the Great Oxygenation Event would have reacted with and oxidized continental iron pyrite (FeS2) deposits, with sulfate (SO42−) as a byproduct, which was transported into the sea. Sulfate-reducing microorganisms converted this to hydrogen sulfide (H2S), dividing the ocean into a somewhat oxic surface layer, and a sulfidic layer beneath, with anoxygenic bacteria living at the border, metabolizing the H2S and creating sulfur as a waste product. This created widespread euxinic conditions in middle-waters, an anoxic state with a high sulfur concentration, which was maintained by the bacteria. However, more systematic geochemical study of the Mid-Proterozoic indicates that the oceans were largely ferruginous with a thin surface layer of weakly oxygenated waters, and euxinia may have occurred over relatively small areas, perhaps less than 7% of the seafloor.

Iron
Among rocks dating to the Boring Billion, there is a conspicuous lack of banded iron formations, which form from iron in the upper water column (sourced from the deep ocean) reacting with oxygen and precipitating out of the water. They seemingly cease around the world after 1.85 Ga. Canfield argued that oceanic SO42− reduced all the iron in the anoxic deep sea. Iron could have been metabolized by anoxygenic bacteria. It has also been proposed that the 1.85 Ga Sudbury meteor impact mixed the previously stratified ocean via tsunamis, interaction between vaporized seawater and the oxygenated atmosphere, oceanic cavitation, and massive runoff of destroyed continental margins into the sea. Resultant suboxic deep waters (due to oxygenated surface water mixing with previously anoxic deep water) would have oxidized deep-water iron, preventing it from being transported and deposited on continental margins.

Nonetheless, iron-rich waters did exist, such as the 1.4 Ga Xiamaling Formation of Northern China, which perhaps was fed by deep water hydrothermal vents. Iron-rich conditions also indicate anoxic bottom water in this area, as oxic conditions would have oxidized all the iron.

Lifeforms
Low nutrient abundance may have facilitated photosymbiosis—where one organism is capable of photosynthesis and the other metabolizes the waste product—among prokaryotes (bacteria and archaea), and the emergence of eukaryotes. Bacteria, Archaea, and Eukaryota are the three domains, the highest taxonomic ranking. Eukaryotes are distinguished from prokaryotes by a nucleus and membrane-bound organelles, and almost all multicellular organisms are eukaryotes.

Prokaryotes

Prokaryotes were the dominant lifeforms throughout the Boring Billion. Microfossils indicate the presence of cyanobacteria, green and purple sulfur bacteria, methane-producing archaea, sulfate-metabolizing bacteria, methane-metabolizing archaea or bacteria, iron-metabolizing bacteria, nitrogen-metabolizing bacteria, and anoxygenic photosynthetic bacteria.

Anoxygenic cyanobacteria are thought to have been the dominant photosynthesizers, metabolizing the abundant H2S in the oceans. In iron-rich waters, cyanobacteria may have suffered from iron poisoning, especially in offshore waters where iron-rich deep water mixed with surface waters, and thus were outcompeted by other bacteria which could metabolize both iron and H2S. However, iron poisoning could have been abated by silica-rich waters or biomineralization of iron within the cell.

Eukaryotes
Eukaryotes may have arisen around the beginning of the Boring Billion, coinciding with the accretion of Columbia, which could have somehow increased oceanic oxygen levels. Multicellular eukaryotes had possibly already evolved by this time, with the earliest claimed fossil evidence dating to the Great Oxygenation Event with jellyfish-like Francevillian biota. Following this, eukaryotic evolution was rather slow, possibly due to the euxinic conditions of the Canfield ocean and a lack of key nutrients and metals which prevented large, complex life with high energy requirements from evolving. Euxinic conditions would have also decreased the solubility of iron and molybdenum, essential metals in nitrogen fixation. A lack of dissolved nitrogen would have favored prokaryotes over eukaryotes, as the former can metabolize gaseous nitrogen.

Nonetheless, the diversification of crown group eukaryotic macroorganisms seems to have started about 1.6–1 Ga, seemingly coinciding with an increase in key nutrient concentrations. According to phylogenetic analysis, plants diverged from animals and fungi about 1.6 Ga; animals and fungi about 1.5 Ga; Bilaterians and cnidarians (animals respectively with and without bilateral symmetry) about 1.3 Ga; sponges 1.35 Ga; and Ascomycota and Basidiomycota (the two divisions of the fungus subkingdom Dikarya) 0.97 Ga. Fossils from the late Palaeoproterozoic and early Mesoproterozoic of the Vindhyan sedimentary basin of India, the Ruyang Group of China, and the Kotuikan Formation of the Anabar Shield of Siberia indicate high rates (by pre-Ediacaran standards) of eukaryotic diversification between 1.7 and 1.4 Ga, although much of this diversity is represented by previously unknown, no longer existing clades of eukaryotes. The earliest known red algae mats date to 1.6 Ga. The earliest known fungus dates to 1.01–0.89 Ga from Northern Canada. Multicellular eukaryotes, thought to be the descendants of colonial unicellular aggregates, had probably evolved about 2–1.4 Ga. Likewise, early multicellular eukaryotes likely mainly aggregated into stromatolite mats.

The red alga Bangiomorpha is the earliest known sexually reproducing and meiotic lifeform, and evolved by 1.047 Ga. Based on this, these adaptations evolved between ca. 2–1.4 Ga. Alternatively, these may have evolved well before the last common ancestor of eukaryotes given that meiosis is performed using the same proteins in all eukaryotes, perhaps stretching to as far back as the hypothesized RNA world.

Cell organelles probably originated from free-living cyanobacteria (symbiogenesis) possibly after the evolution of phagocytosis (engulfing other cells) with the removal of the rigid cell wall which was only necessary for asexual reproduction. Mitochondria had already evolved in the Great Oxygenation Event, but plastids used in primoplants for photosynthesis are thought to have appeared about 1.6–1.5 Ga. Histones likely appeared during the Boring Billion to help organize and package the increasing amount of DNA in eukaryotic cells into nucleosomes. Hydrogenosomes used in anaerobic activity may have originated in this time from an archaeon.

Given the evolutionary landmarks achieved by eukaryotes, this time period could be considered an important precursor to the Cambrian explosion about 0.54 Ga, and the evolution of relatively large, complex life.

Ecology
Due to the marginalization of large food particles, such as algae, in favor of cyanobacteria and prokaryotes which do not transmit as much energy to higher trophic levels, a complex food web likely did not form, and large lifeforms with high energy demands could not evolve. Such a food web probably only sustained a small number of protists as, in a sense, apex predators.

The presumably oxygenic photosynthetic eukaryotic acritarchs, perhaps a type of microalga, inhabited the Mesoproterozoic surface waters. Their population may have been largely limited by nutrient availability rather than predation because species have been reported to have survived for hundreds of millions of years, but after 1 Ga, species duration dropped to about 100 Ma, perhaps due to increased herbivory by early protists. This is consistent with species survival dropping to 10 Ma just after the Cambrian explosion and the expansion of herbivorous animals.

The relatively low concentrations of molybdenum in the ocean throughout the Boring Billion have been suggested as a major limiting factor that kept populations of open ocean nitrogen fixing microorganisms, which require molybdenum to produce nitrogenases, low, although freshwater and coastal environments close to riverine sources of dissolved molybdenum may have still hosted significant communities of nitrogen fixers. The low rate of nitrogen fixation, which only ended during the Cryogenian with the evolution of planktonic nitrogen fixers, meant that free ammonium was in short supply across this time interval, severely constraining the evolution and diversification of multicellular biota.

Life on land
Some of the earliest evidence of the prokaryotic colonization of land dates to before 3 Ga, possibly as early as 3.5 Ga. During the Boring Billion, land may have been inhabited mainly by cyanobacterial mats. Dust would have supplied an abundance of nutrients and a means of dispersal for surface-dwelling microbes, though microbial communities could have also formed in caves and freshwater lakes and rivers. By 1.2 Ga, microbial communities may have been abundant enough to have affected weathering, erosion, sedimentation, and various geochemical cycles, and expansive microbial mats could indicate biological soil crust was abundant.

The earliest terrestrial eukaryotes may have been lichen fungi about 1.3 Ga, which grazed on the microbial mats. Abundant eukaryotic microfossils from the freshwater Scottish Torridon Group seems to indicate eukaryotic dominance in non-marine habitats by 1 Ga, probably due to increased nutrient availability in areas closer to the continents and continental runoff. These lichen may have later facilitated plant colonization 0.75 Ga in some manner. A massive increase in terrestrial photosynthetic biomass seems to have occurred about 0.85 Ga, indicated by a flux in terrestrially-sourced carbon, which may have increased oxygen levels enough to support an expansion of multicellular eukaryotes.

See also
 
 
 
 
 
 The natural nuclear fission reactors at what is now Oklo, Gabon were active in this era

References 

Proterozoic
Plate tectonics
1995 in science